= Kalewa Barracks =

Zambia military base

The Kalewa Barracks is a military command station located in Ndola, Zambia. It was founded in 1963 and is one of the six major military stations in Zambia.
